Hypatopa lucina is a moth in the family Blastobasidae. It is found in Costa Rica.

The length of the forewings is about 5.3 mm. The forewings are pale brown intermixed with white, brownish-orange, and brown scales. The hindwings are translucent pale brown.

Etymology
The specific name refers to Lucina, the goddess of births.

References

Moths described in 2013
Hypatopa